Willis Alexander Otáñez (born April 19, 1973) is an infielder who played for the Baltimore Orioles and Toronto Blue Jays of Major League Baseball. He was born in Cotuí, Dominican Republic.

Otáñez was originally signed by the Los Angeles Dodgers as an amateur free agent in 1990. He played in the Dodgers farm system through the 1995 season, then was traded along with Miguel Cairo to the Seattle Mariners for Mike Blowers. He lasted just a couple months with Seattle before being placed on waivers and claimed by the Baltimore Orioles.

Otáñez made his Major League Baseball debut with the Baltimore Orioles on August 25, 1998. He played the remainder of 1998 and part of {1999 with the Orioles before being claimed on waivers by the Toronto Blue Jays. In 2000, he returned to the Minor Leagues for the Blue Jays.

Otáñez went on to play in the Atlanta Braves organization in 2001, then played for the Bridgeport Bluefish of the Atlantic League of Professional Baseball in 2002. After starting 2003 with the Bluefish, he returned to the Orioles system to finish the season. After spending another full season at Bridgeport in 2004, he has split each subsequent season in the minors and independent leagues and also has played winter ball in the Dominican Professional Baseball League.

Otáñez was named the most valuable player of the 2010 Mexican League season while playing with the Pericos de Puebla. He batted a league-best .393, adding 12 home runs and 76 RBI.

References

External links
, or Retrosheet, or Mexican League, or Venezuelan Winter League

1973 births
Living people
Acereros de Monclova players
Bakersfield Dodgers players
Baltimore Orioles players
Bowie Baysox players
Bridgeport Bluefish players
Broncos de Reynosa players
Camden Riversharks players
Dominican Republic expatriate baseball players in Canada
Dominican Republic expatriate baseball players in Mexico
Dominican Republic expatriate baseball players in the United States
Estrellas Orientales players
Great Falls Dodgers players
Greenville Braves players
Guerreros de Oaxaca players
Gulf Coast Orioles players
Langosteros de Cancún players
Leones del Escogido players
Long Island Ducks players
Major League Baseball first basemen
Major League Baseball players from the Dominican Republic
Major League Baseball third basemen
Mexican League baseball first basemen
Mexican League baseball third basemen
Mexican League Most Valuable Player Award winners
Navegantes del Magallanes players
Dominican Republic expatriate baseball players in Venezuela
Newark Bears players
Olmecas de Tabasco players
Pericos de Puebla players
Petroleros de Minatitlán players
Piratas de Campeche players
Rochester Red Wings players
Rieleros de Aguascalientes players
Rojos del Águila de Veracruz players
San Antonio Missions players
Saraperos de Saltillo players
Sultanes de Monterrey players
Syracuse SkyChiefs players
Tennessee Smokies players
Tigres del Licey players
Toronto Blue Jays players
Toros del Este players
Vero Beach Dodgers players